Westborough is a town in Massachusetts, United States.

Westborough may also refer to the following places:

Settlements 
Westborough, Lincolnshire, England
Westborough, Surrey, England
Westborough station, Massachusetts, United States

Other places 
Westborough (CDP), Massachusetts, United States, within the town of Westborough
Westborough Ward, Essex, England
Westborough Middle School, California, United States

See also
Westboro (disambiguation)